Therien is a hamlet in central Alberta, Canada within the Municipal District of Bonnyville No. 87, located approximately  north of Highway 28 and  southwest of Cold Lake. Therien had a population of 71 in 2014.

Demographics 
The population of Therien according to the 2014 municipal census conducted by the Municipal District of Bonnyville No. 87 is 71.

See also 
List of communities in Alberta
List of hamlets in Alberta

References 

Municipal District of Bonnyville No. 87
Hamlets in Alberta